Stalder is a surname of Swiss origin. Notable people with the surname include:

 Florian Stalder (born 1982), Swiss racing cyclist
 Josef Stalder (1919–1991), Swiss gymnast
 Keith J. Stalder, United States Marine Corps general
 Lara Stalder (born 1994), Swiss ice hockey player
 Marvin Stalder (1905–1982), American rower
 Ralph Stalder (born 1986), Swiss ice hockey player
 Richard Stalder (born 1951), American public official

German-language surnames
German toponymic surnames